Luis Abdón Rodríguez Muelas (born 16 March 1961) is a Chilean former footballer and football manager.

International
He played in eight matches for the Chile national football team from 1984 to 1989. He was also part of Chile's squad for the 1987 Copa América tournament.

Manager
In 2011, he became the manager of San Luis de Quillota in the Primera B de Chile, after having managed the youth system. After adverse results, he was released, but continued as the person in charge of global development of the youth levels.

References

External links
 
 
 Luis Rodríguez at playmakerstats.com (English version of ceroacero.es)
 partidosdelaroja.com at PartidosdelaRoja (in Spanish)

1961 births
Living people
Footballers from Santiago
Chilean footballers
Chilean expatriate footballers
Chile international footballers
Universidad de Chile footballers
Coquimbo Unido footballers
Club Puebla players
Unión Española footballers
Deportes La Serena footballers
Provincial Osorno footballers
Cobresal footballers
Audax Italiano footballers
Santiago Morning footballers
Primera B de Chile players
Chilean Primera División players
Liga MX players
Expatriate footballers in Mexico
Chilean expatriate sportspeople in Mexico
Association football midfielders
Chilean football managers
San Luis de Quillota managers
Primera B de Chile managers